Messapic (also known as Messapian; or as Iapygian) is an extinct Indo-European Paleo-Balkanic language of the southeastern Italian Peninsula, once spoken in Apulia by the Iapygian peoples of the region: the Calabri and Salentini (known collectively as the Messapii), the Peucetians and the Daunians. Messapic was the pre-Roman, non-Italic language of Apulia. It has been preserved in about 600 inscriptions written in an alphabet derived from a Western Greek model and dating from the mid-6th to at least the 2nd century BC, when it went extinct following the Roman conquest of the region.

Name 
The term 'Messapic' or 'Messapian' is traditionally used to refer to a group of languages spoken by the Iapygians, a "relatively homogeneous linguistic community" of non-Italic-speaking tribes (Messapians, Peucetians and Daunians) dwelling in the region of Apulia before the Roman conquest.

However, some scholars have argued that the term 'Iapygian languages' should be preferred for referring to the group of languages spoken in Apulia, with the term 'Messapic' being reserved to the inscriptions found in the Salento peninsula, where the specific tribe of the Messapians had been living in the pre-Roman era.

The name Apulia itself derives from Iapygia after passing from Greek to Oscan to Latin and undergoing subsequent morphological shifts.

Classification 

Messapic was a non-Italic and non-Greek Indo-European language of Balkan origin. Modern archeological and linguistic research and some ancient sources hold that the ancestors of the Iapygians came to Southeastern Italy (present-day Apulia) from the Western Balkans across the Adriatic Sea during the early first millennium BC..

Paleo-Balkanic 
Messapic forms part of the Paleo-Balkan languages. Based upon lexical similarities with the Illyrian languages, some scholars contend that Messapic may have developed from a dialect of pre-Illyrian, meaning that it would have diverged substantially from the Illyrian language(s) spoken in the Balkans by the 5th century BC, while others considered it a direct dialect of Iron Age Illyrian. Messapic is today considered an independent language and not a dialect of Illyrian. Although the unclear interpretation of Messapic inscriptions cannot warrant the placement of Messapic in any specific Indo-European subfamily, some scholars place Illyrian and Messapic in the same branch. Eric Hamp has grouped them under "Messapo-Illyrian", which is further grouped with Albanian under "Adriatic Indo-European". Other schemes group the three languages under "General Illyrian" and "Western Paleo-Balkan". 

A number of shared features between Messapic and Proto-Albanian may have emerged either as a result of linguistic contacts between Proto-Messapic and Pre-Proto-Albanian within the Balkan peninsula in prehistoric times, or of a closer relation as shown by the quality of the correspondences in the lexical area and shared innovations between Messapic and Albanian. Hyllested & Joseph (2022) identify Messapic as the closest language to Albanian, with which it forms a common branch titled Illyric. Hyllested & Joseph (2022) in agreement with recent bibliography identify Greco-Phrygian as the IE branch closest to the Albanian-Messapic one. These two branches form an areal grouping - which is often called "Balkan IE" - with Armenian.

Illyrian languages 
Although the Illyrian languages – and to some extent Messapic itself – are too scarcely attested to allow for an extensive linguistic comparison, the Messapic language is generally regarded as related to, though distinct from, the Illyrian languages. This theory is supported by a series of similar personal and place names from both sides of the Adriatic Sea. Proposed cognates in Illyrian and Messapic, respectively, include: 'Bardyl(l)is/Barzidihi', 'Teuta/Teutā', 'Dazios/Dazes', 'Laidias/Ladi-', 'Platōr/Plator-', 'Iapydes/Iapyges', 'Apulus/Apuli', 'Dalmata/Dalmathus', 'Peucetioe/Peucetii', 'Ana/Ana', 'Beuzas/Bozat', 'Thana/Thana', 'Dei-paturos/Da-matura'.

Albanian 
The linguistic data of Albanian can be used to compensate for the lack of fundamental information on Illyrian, since Proto-Albanian (the ancestor language of Albanian) was likewise an Indo-European language certainly spoken in the Balkans in antiquity, and probably since at least the 7th century BC, as suggested by the presence of archaic loanwords from Ancient Greek.

A number of linguistic cognates with Albanian have been proposed, such as Messapic aran and Albanian arë ("field"), biliā and bijë ("daughter"), or menza- and mëz ("foal"). The toponomy points to a link between the two languages, as some towns in Apulia have no etymological forms outside Albanian linguistic sources. Other linguistic elements such as particles, prepositions, suffixes, lexicon, but also toponyms, anthroponyms and theonyms of the Messapic language find singular affinities with Albanian. Some phonological data can also be compared between the two languages, and it seems likely that Messapic belongs, like Albanian, to a specific subgroup of the Indo-European languages that shows distinct reflections of all the three dorsal consonant rows. In the nominal context, both Messapic and Albanian continue, in the masculine terms in -o-, the Indo-European ending *-osyo (Messapic -aihi, Albanian -i / -u).

Regarding the verbal system, both Messapic and Albanian have formally and semantically preserved the two Indo-European subjunctive and optative moods. If the reconstructions are correct, we can find, in the preterital system of Messapic, reflections of a formation in *-s- (which in other Indo-European languages are featured in the suffix of the sigmatic aorist), as in the 3rd sg. hipades/opades ('he dedicated' < *supo-dʰeh₁-s-t) and in the 3rd pl. stahan ('they placed' < *stah₂-s-n°t). In Albanian, this formation was likewise featured in the category of aorists formed with the suffix -v-. However, except for the dorsal consonant rows, these similarities do not provide elements exclusively relating Messapic and Albanian, and only a few morphological data are comparable.

Oscan theory 
An older theory, rejected by modern linguists, supposed that all Iapygian (i.e. ancient Apulian) dialects were nothing more than forms of the Oscan language. This hypothesis was mainly suggested by a sentence of Aulus Gellius stating that Ennius (who hailed from Rudiae, southern Apulia) used to speak Oscan together with Greek and Latin without mentioning Messapic, a phrase still difficult to explain today. Some scholars wonder whether Gellius knew that Messapic was a language separate from Oscan; if not, he may have simply used Osce instead of Messape. According to a tradition reported by Servius, Ennius claimed to descend from Messapus, the eponymous legendary founder of Messapia, which may suggest that Ennius' third "heart" and language reported by Gellius was not Oscan but Messapic; the nomen Ennius, however, is
apparently Oscan. According to scholar James N. Adams, "Ennius might have known Messapic as well as Oscan, but continued speculation in the absence of any hard evidence is pointless."

History 

The development of a distinct Iapygian culture in southeastern Italy is widely considered to be the result of a confluence of local Apulian material cultures with Balkanic traditions following the cross-Adriatic migrations of proto-Messapic speakers in the early first millennium BC.

The Iapygians most likely left the eastern coasts of the Adriatic for the Italian Peninsula from the 11th century BC onwards, merging with pre-existing Italic and Mycenean cultures and providing a decisive cultural and linguistic imprint. Throughout the second half of the 8th century, contacts between Messapians and Greeks must have been intense and continuous; they began to intensify after the foundation of Taras by Spartan colonists around the end of the century. Despite its geographical proximity with Magna Graecia, however, Iapygia was generally not encompassed in Greek colonial territories, and with the exception of Taras, the inhabitants were evidently able to avoid other Greek colonies in the region. During the 6th century BC Messapia, and more marginally Peucetia, underwent Hellenizing cultural influences, mainly from the nearby Taras. The use of writing systems was introduced during this period, with the acquisition of the Laconian-Tarantine alphabet and its progressive adaptation to the Messapic language. The oldest known Messapic texts date to the 6th century–early 5th century BCE.

The relationship between Messapians and Tarantines deteriorated over time, resulting in a series of clashes between the two peoples from the beginning of the 5th century BC. After two victories of the Tarentines, the Iapygians inflicted a decisive defeat on them, causing the fall of the aristocratic government and the implementation of a democratic one in Taras. It also froze relations between Greeks and the indigenous people for about half a century. Only in the late-5th and 6th centuries did they re-establish relationships. The second great Hellenizing wave occurred during the 4th century BC, this time also involving Daunia and marking the beginning of Peucetian and Daunian epigraphic records, in a local variant of the Hellenistic alphabet that replaced the older Messapic script.

Along with Messapic, Greek and Oscan were spoken and written during the Romanization period all over Apulia, and bilingualism in Greek and Messapic was probably common in southern Apulia at that time. Based upon the legends of the local currencies promoted by Rome, Messapic appears to have been written in the southern zone, Oscan in the northern area, while the central sector was a trilingual area where Messapic, Greek and Oscan co-existed in inscriptions. Messapic epigraphic records seem to have ended by the 2nd century BC. During the 1st century BCE, the language was replaced by Latin, which is the origin of the modern Italian Sallentine dialects of the region.

Phonology 
A characteristic feature of Messapic is the absence of the Indo-European phonological opposition between the vowels /u/ and /o/, the language featuring only an o/u phoneme. Consequently, the superfluous letter /u/ (upsilon) was not taken over following the initial period of adaption of the Western ("red") Greek alphabet. The 'o/u' phoneme existed in opposition to an 'a/o' phoneme formed after the phonological distinction between *o and *a was abandoned. The Proto-Indo-European (PIE) vowel /o/ regularly appears as /a/ in inscriptions (e.g., Venas < *Wenos; menza < *mendyo; tabarā < *to-bhorā). The original PIE phonological opposition between ō and o is still perceptible in Messapic. The diphthong *ou, itself reflecting the merged diphthongs *ou and eu, underwent sound change to develop into ao, then into ō (e.g., *Toutor > Taotor > Θōtor).

The dental affricate or spirant written Θ is frequently used before the sounds ao- or o-, where it is most likely a replacement for the older letter . Another special letter, occurs almost exclusively in Archaic inscriptions from the 6th and 5th centuries BC. Multiple palatalizations have also taken place, as in 'Zis' < *dyēs, 'Artorres' < *Artōryos, or 'Bla(t)θes' < *Blatyos (where '(t)θ' probably denoted a dental affricate or spirant /ts/ or /tš/). Proto-Indo-European *s was rather clearly reflected in initial and intervocalic positions as Messapic h, with notable examples including klaohi and hipa, but note Venas with *s in final position.

The Proto-Indo-European voiced aspirates *bh and *dh are certainly represented by the simple unaspirated voiced obstruents /b/ and /d/ in Messapic (e.g., 'berain' < *bher-; '-des' < *dʰeh₁). On the other hand, the outcomes of the Indo-European palatal, velar, and labiovelar stops remain unclear, with slender evidence.

Alphabet 
The Messapic alphabet is an adaptation of the Western ("red") Greek alphabets, specifically the Laconian-Tarantinian version. The actual Messapic inscriptions are attested from the 6th century BC onward, while the Peucetian and Daunian epigraphic record (written in a local variant of the Hellenistic alphabet rather than in the older Messapic script) only begins in the 4th century BC.

Messapic 
The Greek letter Φ (/pʰ/) was not adopted, because it would have been superfluous for Messapic. While zeta "normally" represented the voiced counterpart to /s/, it may have been an affricate in some cases. The value of Θ is unclear, but is clearly dental; it may be an affricate or a spirant. In any case it appears to have arisen partly as the reflex of the segment *ty.

Apulian
The script used in northern Apulia was rather peculiar, and some consider it to be a distinct writing system named Apulian. A notable difference between the Apulian alphabet and the Laconian-Tarentinian Messapic alphabet was the use of Η (eta) for /ē/ rather than /h/.

Inscriptions 
The Messapic language is a 'fragmentary language', preserved only in about 600 inscriptions from the mid-6th up until the late-2nd century BC. Many of them consist of personal names of deceased engraved in burial sites (36% of the total), and only a few inscriptions have been definitely deciphered. Some longer texts are also available, including those recently found in the Grotta della Poesia (Roca Vecchia), although they have not been fully exploited by scholars yet. Most of the Messapic inscriptions are accessible in the Monumenta Linguae Messapicae (MLM), published in print in 2002.

Lexicon

Toponymy/Anthroponymy
{| class="wikitable"
! Messapic
! Modern Italian
! Balkan correspondences
! Sources
|-
| Amantia, settlement
| Amantea
| Amantia  Amantes  Amantini
| 
|- 
| (Taotor) Andirabas, god
| 
| (Deus) Andinus 
| 
|-
| Anxa (Ansha), settlement
| - 
| -
| 
|-
| Apsias, river
| -
| Apsus
| 
|-
| Apuli, tribal groupTeanum Apulum, settlement
| Apulia
| Apulus, personal name
| 
|-
| Artas, personal name
| -
| -
| 
|-
| Ausculum, settlement
| Ascoli Satriano
| -
| 
|-
| Azetium, settlement
| near Rutigliano
| Azeta, Dardania
| 
|-
| Barium, settlement
| Bari
| -
| 
|-
| Barzidihi, personal name  Barduli, settlement
| -
| Bardyllis
| 
|-
| Batas/Baton, deity/personal name
| -
| Bato
| 
|-
| Brendésion/Brentésion, settlement
| Brindisi
| Brač
| 
|-
| Butuntum, settlement
| Bitonto
| Butua
| 
|-
| Calabri, tribal group
| Calabria
| Galabri
| 
|-
| Caelia, settlement
| Ceglie del Campo
| Čelje 
| 
|-
| Canusium, settlement
| Canosa di Puglia
| -
| 
|-
| Dazas/Dazimas/(Latin or ancient Greek forms: Dazos/Dazimos/Dasio/Dassius), personal name
| -
| Dasius/Dassius, personal name
| 
|-
| Dardanos, settlement
| -
| Dardani
| 
|-
| Genusium/ager Genusinus, settlement/district
| Ginosa
| Genusus (modern Shkumbin)
| 
|-
| Gnatia, settlement
| -
| -
| 
|-
| Graiva
| -
| -
| 
|-
| Herdonia, settlement
| Ordona
| -
| 
|-
| Hydruntum, settlement
| Otranto
| -
| 
|-
| Ladi-, personal name component
| -
| Scerdilaidas
| 
|-
| Peucetii
| -
| Peucetioe, Liburnia
| 
|-
| Rudiae, settlement
| -
| -
| 
|-
| Salapia, settlement  Salapitani, tribal group
| -
| Selepitani
| 
|-
| Taotor, deity
| -
| Teuta, Triteuta, Teutana
| 
|-
| Thana, deity
| -
| Thana
| 
|- 
| Uria, settlement
| Vereto
| -
| 
|-
| Uxentum, settlement
| Ugento/Ušèntu
| -
| 
|}

 Inherited 
Only Messapic words regarded as 'inherited' are hereunder listed, thus excluding loanwords from Greek, Latin or other languages.

 Language contact 
Italic

Since its settlement, Messapic was in contact with the Italic languages of the region. In the centuries before Roman annexation, the frontier between Messapic and Oscan ran through Frentania-Irpinia-Lucania-Apulia. An "Oscanization" and "Samnitization" process gradually took place which is attested in contemporary sources via the attestation of dual identities for settlements. In these regions an Oscan/Lucanian population and a large Daunian element intermixed in different ways. Larinum, a settlement which has produced a large body of Oscan onomastics is described as a "Daunian city" and Horace who was from Venusia in the transboundary area between the Daunians and the Lucanians described himself as  "Lucanian or Apulian". The creation of Roman colonies in southern Italy after the early 4th century BCE had a great impact in the Latinization of the area. 

A small corpus of Messapic vocabulary did pass into Latin. They include baltea from balta (swamp), deda (nurse), gandeia (sword), horeia (small fishing boat), mannus (ponny/small horse) from manda. Messapic was an intermediary for the passing of several, mostly ancient Greek words, into Latin such as paro (small ship) from Greek paroon. The Latin form of Odysseus,  Ulixes might derive from a Messapic variant like the ethnonym Graeci which may have been used in its original form by Illyrians for their Greek neighbours in Epirus. A Messapic morphological intermediary has been proposed for Latin lancea (spear) and balaena (from Greek phallaina). In literature, Horace and Ennius who came from the region are the only authors of Roman antiquity who have preserved the non-Italic word laama (swamp) which might be Messapic.

Ancient Greek
The Messapic verbal form eipeigrave ('wrote, incised'; variant ipigrave) is a notable loanword from Greek (with the initial stem eipigra-, ipigra- deriving from epigrá-phō, ἐπιγράφω, 'inscribe, engrave'), and is probably related to the fact that the Messapic alphabet has been borrowed from an Archaic Greek script. Other Greek loanwords include argora-pandes ('coin officials', with the first part deriving from ἄργυρος), and names of deities like Aprodita and Athana. The origin of the Messapic goddess Damatura is debated: scholars like Vladimir I. Georgiev (1937), Eqrem Çabej, Shaban Demiraj (1997), or Martin L. West (2007) have argued that she was an Illyrian goddess eventually borrowed into Greek as Demeter, while others like Paul Kretschmer (1939), Robert S. P. Beekes (2009) and Carlo De Simone (2017) have argued for the contrary.

See also

Indo-European languages
Paleo Balkan languages
Illyrian languages
Albanian language
List of ancient peoples of Italy
Magna Graecia
Iapygians
Daunians
Messapians
Peucetians
Ancient Greek
Italic languages
Oscan language

Sources
Footnotes

Citations

Bibliography

 

 Further reading 
Lomas, Kathryn. "Crossing Boundaries: The Inscribed Votives of Southeast Italy." Pallas, no. 86, 2011, pp. 311–329. JSTOR, www.jstor.org/stable/43606696. Accessed 15 Apr. 2020.

 Messapische Studien''. Inschriften mit Kommentar, Skizze einer Laut- und Formenlehre. Von Otto Haas Universitätdozent - Wien. Heidelberg: Carl Winter - Universitätsverlag. 1962.

External links 
 Civiltà messapica 
 Archaeologists find western world's oldest map.  Telegraph Newspaper Online, November 19, 2005.

Unclassified Indo-European languages
Languages of ancient Italy
Salento
Paleo-Balkan languages
Languages attested from the 6th century BC
Languages extinct in the 1st century BC
Illyrian languages